or , according to protocol, is the honorific title used in Japan to refer to the current Emperor of Japan instead of using their personal name (e.g. Hirohito), as is done in the West. The only context where the personal name is used is when referring to their time before taking the throne (e.g. Prince Hirohito  Hirohito shinnō).

History
However, this   system was only implemented in the modern age of the Meiji Restoration. In the past, the emperor's name never matched the era name, and the  could occur any number of times. Additionally, some emperors had two gō titles, when reoccupying the throne in a process called . One example of this was Empress Kōgyoku, who later mounted the throne as Empress Saimei.

Attaching the title "Emperor" and his Japanese era name has formed a posthumous name, from "Emperor Meiji" to "Emperor Taishō" and "Emperor Shōwa", so doing it to refer to still living Emperor Emeritus Akihito and the Reigning Emperor Naruhito is a faux pas.

See also 
Arahitogami
Emperor of Japan
Kigensetsu
Kofun

References

Japanese emperors
Deified Japanese people
Japanese monarchy
Japanese honorifics
Royal styles